Por ella soy Eva (International Title:  Me, Her and Eva!, Literal Translation: For Her, I'm Eva) is a Mexican soap opera produced by Rosy Ocampo for Televisa based on the Colombian soap opera En los tacones de Jorge.'''

Episodes

References

Lists of Mexican television series episodes